Carel Stith (born May 24, 1945) is a former American football defensive tackle and defensive end. He played for the Houston Oilers from 1967 to 1969.

References

1945 births
Living people
American football defensive tackles
American football defensive ends
Nebraska Cornhuskers football players
Houston Oilers players